Sunday Orinya Ifere (born 19 December 1943) was a Nigerian army officer who was the Military Governor of Kwara State between July 1978 and October 1979.
As a lieutenant, in the unsuccessful Nigerian counter-coup of 1966 he was involved in fighting in Kaduna, serving in the same squadron as Ibrahim Babangida, who later became military head of state from August 1985 until August 1993. A colonel when military governor, he retired as a major general.

References

Nigerian generals
Living people
1943 births
Governors of Kwara State